Max Rüegg (born March 12, 1942) is a retired Swiss professional ice hockey player who represented the Swiss national team at the 1964 Winter Olympics.

References

External links
Max Rüegg's stats at Sports-Reference.com

1942 births
Living people
Ice hockey people from Bern
SC Bern players
Ice hockey players at the 1964 Winter Olympics
Olympic ice hockey players of Switzerland
Swiss ice hockey defencemen